Sigurd E. "Sandy" Sandberg (June 14, 1910 – April 10, 1989) was an American football tackle who played four seasons in the National Football League (NFL) with the St. Louis Gunners, Pittsburgh Pirates and Brooklyn Dodgers. He played college football at Iowa Wesleyan University.

College career
Sandberg attended Iowa Wesleyan University from 1928 to 1933, where he participated in football, basketball and the discus in track. He earned All-Conference honoris in 1929, 1930 and 1931 as a tackle. He was a member of Sigma Phi Epsilon, Letter Club and Blue Key as a student. Sandberg was inducted into the Iowa Wesleyan University Athletic Hall of Fame in 2005.

Professional career
Sandberg played in three games, all starts, for the NFL's St. Louis Gunners in 1934. He played in 30 games, starting 25, for the Pittsburgh Pirates of the NFL from 1935 to 1937. He played in three games, starting one, for the Brooklyn Dodgers of the NFL during the 1937 season.

Personal life
Sandberg served in World War II as an infantryman in northern Italy. He was captured by the Germans in 1944 held as a prisoner of war for a year and a half before being rescued along with 30 other soldiers. He ran a plumbing company in St. Louis, Missouri after the war.

References

External links
Just Sports Stats

1910 births
1989 deaths
American football tackles
American male discus throwers
American men's basketball players
Basketball players from Iowa
Iowa Wesleyan Tigers football players
Iowa Wesleyan Tigers men's basketball players
College men's track and field athletes in the United States
St. Louis Gunners players
Pittsburgh Pirates (football) players
Brooklyn Dodgers (NFL) players
American prisoners of war in World War II
World War II prisoners of war held by Germany
20th-century American businesspeople
Businesspeople from Iowa
Players of American football from Iowa
People from Eddyville, Iowa